The 1938–39 season was Colchester United's second season in their history and their second in the Southern League. Alongside competing in the Southern League, the club also participated in the Southern League Mid-Week Section and Southern League Cup. Colchester won the Southern League title after beating local rivals Chelmsford City to the top of the league by one point. They also reached the 1st round of the FA Cup, where they were eliminated by Folkestone, and finished as runners-up to Tunbridge Wells Rangers in the Mid-Week Section. They reached the semi-final of the Southern League Cup, but the competition could not be completed due to fixture congestion.

Season overview
Manager Ted Davis began strengthening his squad ready for a push to reach the Football League over the summer period. The public responded by turning out in force for a game against Gillingham, with 8,142 in attendance, and a week later, a visit from Arsenal 'A' saw 10,129 watch Colchester beat their counterparts 2–0. However, Davis securing a number of high-profile players came at a cost. Many were still contracted to the Football League clubs that they were signed from, meaning that if Colchester were to gain election to the Football League, the club would have very few contracted players.

Colchester made their first FA Cup outing during the 1938–39 season. They saw off Ilford 4–1 at Layer Road, but were defeated in the first round proper by Folkestone, watched by 8,160.

In a very successful season for the club, Colchester claimed the Southern League title by one point over Guildford City, scoring 110 goals in 44 games. They finished second in the Mid-Week Section, and reached the semi-final of the Southern League Cup, although due to fixture congestion, the game could not be played during the regular season and was postponed until the 1939–40 campaign.

Overall, Colchester scored 161 goals, with Arthur Pritchard netting 44 goals, George Wallis 24, and Alec Cheyne and Len Astill scoring 21 apiece.

The case for Football League election was presented to Football League members on 23 May 1938 by club director Walter Clark. With high hopes for election following a successful season, Colchester United failed to secure a single vote from the members, put down to the fact that there were so many League-registered players on the books that Davis had signed for Colchester.

Despite the League setback, the ownership of the Layer Road ground was passed to Colchester Borough Council, with club chairman Maurice Pye declaring:

Players

Transfers

In

 Total spending:  ~ £8,050

Out

 Total incoming:  ~ £500

Match details

Friendlies

Southern League

League table

Matches

Southern League Mid-Week Section

League table

Matches

Southern League Cup

FA Cup

Squad statistics

Appearances and goals

|-
!colspan="14"|Players who appeared for Colchester who left during the season

|}

Goalscorers

Captains
Number of games played as team captain.

Clean sheets
Number of games goalkeepers kept a clean sheet.

Player debuts
Players making their first-team Colchester United debut in a fully competitive match.

See also
List of Colchester United F.C. seasons

References

General

Specific

1938-39
English football clubs 1938–39 season